Mayilu is a 2012 Indian Tamil-language film directed by M. Jeevan and produced by actor Prakash Raj, starring Shri, Shammu and Vidharth. The film was in production since 2008 got released only on 26 October 2012.

Plot
The film revolves around village girl Mayilu, who happens to fall in love with Chellapandi. Chellapandi does not believe in God, but he turns out to be someone whose words were considered as God's one by the villagers. The villagers considered that the local deity has manifested in him. Mayilu informs Chellapandi that she is pregnant and elopes with him. Murugan helps them. However, the city doctor reveals to Murugan that Chellapandi has some psychological issues. Mayilu is married to Chellapandi. Due to his psychological issues, Chellapandi gets aggressive when he hears lies. He beats the person who lied to him in his working time severely. Murugan calms him. Without knowing his reaction to lies, the same day in house, Mayilu reveals to Chellapandi that she lied to him that she was pregnant as she was afraid of losing him. Later, Chellapandi gets treatment. A treated Chellapandi asks for Mayilu, Murugan recalls what happened on the fateful night when Mayilu told the truth to Chellapandi. Fearing the aggressive Chellapandi, the ignorant Mayilu though him as the manifestation of the local deity and hands over the "Aruval" to him and asks the deity to leave Chellapandi for the betterment of their life. And without his own conscious, he kills her. The film ends showing him being arrested and leaving in a van and watching the people who are going for local deity worship.

Cast

 Shri as Sellapandi
 Shammu as Mayilu
 Vidharth as Murugan
 Ganja Karuppu
 Pattimandram Raja
 Kathir

Production
After the success of Mozhi (2007), Moser Baer who released the DVD of Mozhi under their company collaborated with Duet Movies and launched three projects on 2007 with Mayilu being one of them.

Debutant Shammu was chosen for the titular character after being auditioned in screen test. In order to portray a village girl, she had to sport dark makeup, oily braid and dirty clothes, to resemble a typical girl from Madurai. Her younger sister portrayed the younger version of the character. During the production, Prakash Raj also suggested her name for another project Kanchivaram that he was working in. Another debutant Sri was chosen as lead actor, he had to spend two months in Madura to observe people and their body language to get into the character.

The shooting for this film, which commenced on 2 October, concluded within 45 days and it was entirely shot at Usilampatti.

Though the film was completed in 2008, its release was delayed due to financial problems and was released in 2012.

Soundtrack
Soundtrack was composed by Ilaiyaraaja and lyrics written by M. Jeevan.
"Nammaloda Paattuthan" - Tippu, Karthik
"Yathe" - Bhavatharini, Sriram Parthasarathy
"Kalyanamam" - Chinnaponnu, Tippu, Thiruvudaiyan, Rita
"Thukkamenna" - Rita, Sriram Parthasarathy
"Adisokka" - Rita
"Enna Kutham" - Ilaiyaraaja, Darshana KT

Reception
Behindwoods wrote "In a nutshell, the film is a sad and tragic one and has wailing sequences in regular intervals." Times of India wrote "Though the movie is didactic in conception, the approach Jeevan employs is such that these ideas merge well with the plot. But the slow pace prevents the movie from being an engrossing watch." Moviecrow stated that film "neither entertains nor engages".

References

External links
 
 Mayilu on Moviebuff

2012 films
Films scored by Ilaiyaraaja
2010s Tamil-language films
Indian drama films